Hands Down may refer to:

Film
 Hands Down (film), a 1918 silent film directed by Rupert Julian

Music
Hands Down (album), by Bob Jones
"Hands Down" (song), by Dashboard Confessional 
"Hands Down", by Dan Hartman, 1979
"Hands Down", by Dog Is Dead, 201

Game
Hands Down (game), children's board game introduced in 1964